Joseph Charles Low (August 11, 1911 – February 12, 2007) was an American artist and children's book illustrator.

Low was born in Coraopolis, Pennsylvania . He made cover illustrations for The New Yorker between 1940 and 1980. Low illustrated Jan de Hartog's novel, The Little Ark, which was published in 1953. Low also illustrated God Returns to the Vuelta Abajo by Melanie Earle Keiser, published in 1936. He was a runner-up for the annual Caldecott Medal, recognizing his illustration of Mice Twice, a picture book that he also wrote (Atheneum Books, 1980).  He died in at his home in Edgartown, Massachusetts.

References

External links

Joseph Low's cover art for The New Yorker
 

1911 births
2007 deaths
American children's book illustrators
The New Yorker people
People from Coraopolis, Pennsylvania
People from Edgartown, Massachusetts